Route 778 is a  long north to south secondary highway in the southeastern portion of New Brunswick, Canada.

Route description
The route is in Charlotte County.

The route's northern terminus is in Pennfield at Route 176, where it travels southeast through a mostly wooded area past Woodland Cove and Beaver Harbour to Beaver Harbour.  From here, the route is known as Deadmans Harbour Rd.  The route passes Moose Island as it passes through Deadmans Harbour, and it ends in the community of Blacks Harbour at Route 176.

History

See also

References

778
778